Owlad-e Naqiabad (also Romanized as Owlād-e Naqīābād) is a village in Tarhan-e Sharqi Rural District, Tarhan District, Kuhdasht County, Lorestan Province, Iran. At the 2006 census, its population was 203, in 38 families.

References 

Towns and villages in Kuhdasht County